The Mask Thai Literature is the seventh season of The Mask Singer, a Thai singing competition program presented by Kan Kantathavorn. The program aired on Workpoint TV on Thursday at 20:05 from 28 March 2019 to 8 August 2019.

The tournament format is similar to that of The Mask Line Thai. But the difference is this season was combined with Thai literature.

Panel of Judges

First round

Group 1 Mai Ek

Group 2 Mai Tho

Group 3 Mai Tri

Group 4 Mai Chattawa

Semi-final

Group 1 Mai Ek

Group 2 Mai Tho

Group 3 Mai Tri

Group 4 Mai Chattawa

Final

Champ VS Champ

First round

Second round

Champ of the Champ

Celebration of The Mask Champion

Elimination table

References 

The Mask Singer (Thai TV series)
2019 Thai television seasons